Thiruvonam block is a revenue block in Thanjavur district, Tamil Nadu, India. There are a total of 30 villages and 15 Union wards in this block. Before 2011 Thiruvonam is an MLA constituency now it is degraded into union block.Agriculture is the major occupation of this block.

List of Panchayat villages

References 
 

Revenue blocks of Thanjavur district